Soldridge is a hamlet in the East Hampshire district of Hampshire, England.

The nearest railway station is the restored Medstead & Four Marks station on the Watercress Line, trains from which connect with the nearest national rail station  to the northeast, at Alton.

History
Soldridge is first mentioned in 1233 as Solrigge meaning the muddy pond on the ridge. It is mentioned frequently throughout medieval documents, in relation to nearby Medstead, as a farm likely stood there.

References 

Villages in Hampshire